Elizabeth Roberts is the name of:

Elizabeth H. Roberts (born 1957), former Rhode Island lieutenant governor
Elizabeth Ann Roberts (born 1941), Playboy Playmate of the Month, January 1958
Elizabeth Madox Roberts (1881–1941), Kentucky novelist and poet
Betty Roberts (1923–2011), American politician from Oregon
Elizabeth Wentworth Roberts (1871–1927), American painter
Liz Saville Roberts (born 1964), Welsh member of Parliament
Elizabeth Roberts (murder victim), a formerly unidentified murder victim